John Moses Browning (January 23, 1855 – November 26, 1926) was an American firearm designer who developed many varieties of military and civilian firearms, cartridges, and gun mechanismsmany of which are still in use around the world. He made his first firearm at age 13 in his father's gun shop and was awarded the first of his 128 firearm patents on October 7, 1879, at the age of 24. He is regarded as one of the most successful firearms designers of the 19th and 20th centuries and pioneered the development of modern repeating, semi-automatic, and automatic firearms.

Browning influenced nearly all categories of firearms design, especially the autoloading of ammunition. He invented, or made significant improvements to, single-shot, lever-action, and pump-action rifles and shotguns. He developed the first reliable and compact autoloading pistols by inventing the telescoping bolt, then integrating the bolt and barrel shroud into what is known as the pistol slide. Browning's telescoping bolt design is now found on nearly every modern semi-automatic pistol, as well as several modern fully automatic weapons. He also developed the first gas-operated firearm, the Colt–Browning Model 1895 machine guna system that surpassed mechanical recoil operation to become the standard for most high-power self-loading firearm designs worldwide. He also made significant contributions to automatic cannon development.

Browning's most successful designs include the M1911 pistol, the water-cooled M1917, the air-cooled M1919, and heavy M2 machine guns, the M1918 Browning Automatic Rifle, and the Browning Auto-5the first semi-automatic shotgun. Some of these arms are still manufactured, often with only minor changes in detail and cosmetics to those assembled by Browning or his licensees. The Browning-designed M1911 and Hi-Power are some of the most copied firearms in the world.

Life and works 

Browning's father Jonathan—who was among the thousands of pioneers of the Church of Jesus Christ of Latter-day Saints who made an exodus from Nauvoo, Illinois, to Utah—established a gunsmith shop in Ogden in 1852. As was common in the Latter-day Saint community at the time, Jonathan Browning was a polygamist, having taken three wives. He fathered 22 children, including John Moses Browning, and raised two stepdaughters with his wife Elizabeth Caroline Clark.

John Moses worked in his father's Ogden shop from the age of seven, where he was taught basic engineering and manufacturing principles, and encouraged to experiment with new concepts. There he developed his first rifle, a single-shot falling block action design, then, in 1878, in partnership with his younger brother, co-founded John Moses and Matthew Sandefur Browning Company, later renamed Browning Arms Company, and began to produce this and other non-military firearms. By 1882, the company employed John and Matthew's half-brothers Jonathan (1859–1939), Thomas (1860–1943), William (1862–1919), and George (1866–1948).

Like his father, Browning was a member of The Church of Jesus Christ of Latter-day Saints, and served a two-year mission in Georgia beginning on March 28, 1887.

He married Rachel Theresa Child (September 14, 1860 – September 30, 1934) on April 10, 1879, in Ogden, Weber County, Utah Territory, and the couple had 10 children, two of whom died in infancy.

Firearm designs 

Production examples of the Browning Model 1878 Single Shot Rifle caught the attention of the Winchester Repeating Arms Company, who dispatched a representative to evaluate the competition. Winchester bought the design for $8,000 and moved production to their Connecticut factory. From 1883, Browning worked in partnership with Winchester and designed a series of rifles and shotguns, most notably the lever action Winchester Model 1887 and the Model 1897 pump shotgun, the falling-block single-shot Model 1885, and the lever-action Model 1886, Model 1892, Model 1894, Model 1895 rifles. After falling out with Winchester, Browning designed the long recoil operated semi-automatic Remington Model 8 rifle. Many of the models are still in production today in some form; over six million Model 1894s had been produced as of 1983, more than any other sporting rifle in history.

Winchester manufactured several popular small arms designed by John M. Browning. For decades in the late 19th century-early 20th century, Browning designs and Winchester firearms were synonymous and the collaboration was highly successful. This came to an end when Browning proposed a new long recoil operated semi-automatic shotgun design, a prototype finished in 1898, to Winchester management, which ultimately became the Browning Auto-5 shotgun. As was the custom of the time, Browning's earlier designs had been sold exclusively to Winchester for a single fee payment. With this new product, Browning and his brother Matthew sought royalties based upon unit sales, rather than a single front-end fee payment. If the new shotgun became highly successful, the Browning company stood to make substantially more income. Winchester management, which had agreed to royalties for an earlier Browning shotgun design that was never manufactured, now refused to accede to the Brownings' terms. Remington Arms also was approached but the president of the company died of a heart attack while the Brownings were waiting to offer him the gun. Remington would later produce a copy of the Auto-5 as the Model 11 which was used by the US Military and was also sold to the civilian market.

Having recently successfully negotiated firearm licenses with Fabrique Nationale de Herstal of Belgium (FN), Browning took the new shotgun design to FN; the offer was accepted and FN manufactured the new shotgun, honoring its inventor, as the Browning Auto-5. The Browning Auto-5 was continuously manufactured as a highly popular shotgun throughout the 20th century. In response, Winchester shifted reliance away from John Browning designs when it adopted a shotgun design of Thomas Crossley Johnson for the new Winchester Model 1911 SL, (Johnson had to work around Browning's patents of what became the Auto-5) and the new Model 1912 pump shotgun, which was based in small part upon design features of the earlier Browning-designed Winchester Model 1897 shotgun. This shift marked the end of an era of Winchester-Browning collaboration.

Later work and life 

John Browning was known as a dedicated and tireless innovator and experimenter who sought breakthrough consumer-oriented features and performance and reliability improvements in small arms designs. He did not retire in his later years but dedicated his entire adult life literally to his last day to these pursuits. On November 26, 1926, while working at the bench on a self-loading pistol design for Fabrique Nationale de Herstal (FN) in Liège, he died of heart failure in the design shop of his son Val A. Browning. Even the 9 mm semi-automatic pistol he was working on when he died had great design merit and was eventually completed in 1935 by Belgian designer Dieudonné Saive. Released as the Fabrique Nationale GP35, it was more popularly known as the successful Browning Hi-Power pistol, a favorite of sportsmen and gun collectors as well as many military and law enforcement agencies around the world.

The premium-priced Browning Superposed shotgun, an over-under shotgun design, was his last completed firearm design. It was marketed originally with twin triggers; a single trigger modification was later completed by his son, Val Browning. Commercially introduced in 1931 by FN, Browning Superposed shotguns, and their more affordable cousins, the Browning Citori made in Asia, continue to be manufactured into the 21st century and come with varying grades of fine hand engraving and premium quality wood.

Throughout his life, Browning designed a vast array of military and civilian small arms for his own company, as well as for Winchester, Colt, Remington, Savage, Stevens, and Fabrique Nationale de Herstal of Belgium. Browning firearms have been made, both licensed and unlicensed, by hundreds of factories around the world. Browning Arms Company was established in 1927, the year after Browning's death on November 26, 1926, in Liège, Belgium. In 1977, FN Herstal acquired the company.

Legacy 
The M1895 Machine Gun saw action in the Spanish–American War with the United States Marine Corps. The Colt M1911, Browning 1917/19, and the BAR saw action with US forces in World War I, World War II, and the Korean War. The M1911 went on to serve as the U.S.'s standard military side arm until 1986; a variant is still used by special operations units of the United States Marine Corps and the design remains very popular among civilian shooters and some police departments. The Browning Hi-Power has had a similarly lengthy period of military service outside the United States and remains the standard sidearm of the Australian and Canadian armed forces. The .50 caliber M2 Browning machine gun – the enduring "Ma Deuce" – was developed in 1918, entered service with the US Armed Forces in 1921, and has remained in active service for over a century with militaries across the world in a variety of roles. The 37mm M4 autocannon was initially designed by Browning in 1921 and entered service in 1938; it was used both in aircraft and on U.S. Navy PT boats during World War II.

Products 
Several of Browning's designs are still in production today. Some of his most notable designs include:

Cartridges 

.25 ACP
.32 ACP
.38 ACP
.380 ACP
.45 ACP
.50 BMG
9mm Browning Long

Firearms

Pistols 
FN M1899/M1900 (.32 ACP)
Colt Model 1900 (.38 ACP)
Colt Model 1902 (.38 ACP)
Colt Model 1903 Pocket Hammer (.38 ACP)
FN Model 1903 (9mm Browning Long)
Colt Model 1903 Pocket Hammerless (.32 ACP)
FN Model 1906 Vest Pocket (.25 ACP)
Colt Model 1908 Vest Pocket (.25 ACP)
Colt Model 1908 Pocket Hammerless (.380 ACP)
FN Model 1910 (.32 ACP, .380 ACP)
FN model 1922 (.32 ACP) and (.380 ACP)
U.S. M1911 pistol (.45 ACP)
Browning Hi-Power (9mm Parabellum)
Colt Woodsman pistol (.22 LR)

Shotguns 
Savage Model 720 long-recoil semi-automatic shotgun
Ithaca Model 37 pump-action repeating shotgun
Stevens Model 520/620 pump-action repeating shotgun
Winchester Model 1887 lever-action repeating shotgun
Winchester Model 1893 pump-action repeating shotgun
Winchester Model 1897 pump-action repeating shotgun
Winchester Model 1912 pump-action repeating shotgun
Browning Auto-5 long-recoil semi-automatic shotgun
Browning Superposed over/under shotgun
Remington Model 17 pump-action repeating shotgun

Rifles 
Winchester Model 1885 falling-block single-shot rifle
Winchester Model 1886 lever-action repeating rifle
Winchester Model 1890 slide-action repeating rifle (.22 LR)
Winchester Model 1892 lever-action repeating rifle
Winchester Model 1894 lever-action repeating rifle
Winchester Model 1895 lever-action repeating rifle
Winchester Model 1900 bolt-action single-shot rifle (.22 LR)
Remington Model 8 semi-auto rifle
Browning 22 Semi-Auto rifle (.22 LR)
Remington Model 24 semi-auto rifle (.22 LR)
FN Trombone pump-action rifle (.22 LR)

Machine guns 
U.S. M1895 air-cooled gas-operated machine gun
U.S. M1917 water-cooled recoil-operated machine gun
U.S. M1919 air-cooled recoil-operated machine gun
U.S. M1918 Browning Automatic Rifle (BAR)
U.S. M2 .50-caliber heavy machine gun
U.S. M4 37mm Automatic Gun

Selected patents 
 Winchester 1885 single-shot rifle, Browning's first patent
 Winchester 1886 and Model 71 lever-action rifles
 Winchester Model 1887/1901 lever-action shotgun
 Winchester 1890 pump-action rifle
 Winchester 1893 and 1897 pump-action shotguns
 Winchester 1892 lever-action rifle
 Winchester 1894 lever-action rifle
 Colt–Browning Model 1895 machine gun
 Winchester 1895 lever-action rifle
 Colt 1900 automatic pistol
 Winchester 1900 bolt-action single-shot .22 rifle
 Browning Auto-5 shotgun, also Remington Model 11 and Savage 720
 Remington Model 8 semi-automatic rifle
 M1917 Browning machine gun
 Colt Model 1903 Pocket Hammerless automatic pistol
 Stevens 520 pump-action shotgun
 Colt Model 1905 in .45 ACP (predecessor to the M1911)
 FN Model 1906 and Colt Model 1908 Vest Pocket in .25 ACP
 Colt 1911
 Browning 22 Semi-Auto rifle and Remington model 24
 Remington Model 17 and Ithaca 37 pump-action shotguns
 Colt Woodsman
 Browning Automatic Rifle Model of 1918
 FN "Trombone" pump action .22 caliber repeater (Rare in USA)
 37 mm automatic cannons, M1 and M4
 Browning Superposed over/under shotgun
 FN and Browning Hi-Power pistol
 M2 Browning machine gun in .50 BMG

See also 
Browning Arms Company
John Moses Browning House
Charles Petter
Sig Holding
SIG Sauer

References

General sources 
 Browning, John, and Curt Gentry (1964).  John M. Browning, American Gunmaker. New York: Doubleday. .

External links 

 The Ogden Union Station Browning Museum
 M-1911 Pistol History
 1911 Pistol Photo Reference Site Past Items Sold at Auction

1855 births
1926 deaths
19th-century American inventors
20th-century American inventors
Ammunition designers
Gunsmiths
Firearm designers
Businesspeople from Ogden, Utah
American Mormon missionaries in the United States
19th-century Mormon missionaries
Latter Day Saints from Utah